Birgitta Arman (born 3 August 1921 in Stockholm, Sweden; died 13 April 2007 in Stockholm, Sweden) was a Swedish actress, best known for her roles in the 1940s, including her role as Gretta in the 1945 film Blood and Fire.

Selected filmography
 The Bjorck Family (1940)
 The Case of Ingegerd Bremssen (1942)
 Life in the Country (1943)
 Imprisoned Women (1943)
 Blood and Fire (1945)
Widower Jarl (1945)

References

External links

1921 births
2007 deaths
Actresses from Stockholm
Swedish film actresses